Çinarlı (also, Cinarlı, known as Novograzhdanovka until 1991) is a village and municipality in the Bilasuvar Rayon of Azerbaijan.  It has a population of 693.

References 

Populated places in Bilasuvar District